Blanchard, Pennsylvania may refer to:

Blanchard, Allegheny County, Pennsylvania
Blanchard, Centre County, Pennsylvania